Limor Mizrachi (born June 24, 1970) is an Israeli former professional basketball player and a former member of the Israeli women's national basketball team. During her career, she won national championships in Croatia, Iceland, Israel and Poland.

College
Mizrachi played for Maryland during the 1991–92 season. She started all 30 games for the Terrapins and helped them reach the National Collegiate Athletic Association East Regional final. She left the school and returned to Israel after her mother was diagnosed with cancer.

Career
In 1997, Mizrachi tried out for the New York Liberty but did not make the final cut.

In 1998, Mizrachi  became the first Israeli to play professional basketball in the United States when she played for New England Blizzard in the American Basketball League until it folded on December 22, 1998.

In January 1999, Mizrachi joined KR of the Icelandic top-tier 1. deild kvenna. On February 6, she helped KR win the Icelandic Basketball Cup after beating ÍS in the cup finals. Prior to her arrival, KR had won its first twelve league games. They finished the season with a perfect 20-0 record and swept through the playoffs, winning all five games and claiming the 1999 national championship. After the season she was named the Foreign Player of the Year.

In 2003, she won the Israeli championship and the Israeli Basketball Cup with A.S. Ramat-Hasharon. For the season she averaged 14.4 points and league leading 6.5 assists per game.

In 2004, Mizrachi won the Polish championship as a member of Lotos Gdynia.

In 2006, she won the Croatian championship as a member of ŽKK Gospić.

Mizrachi retired in 2008 after playing two seasons with A.S. Ramat-Hasharon.

Israeli national basketball team
Mizrachi played for the Israeli national basketball team from 1988 to 2004, helping them to the European Women Basketball Championship in 1991 and 2003.

Awards, titles and accomplishments

Individual awards

Iceland
Úrvalsdeild Foreign Player of the Year: 1999

Titles

Croatia
Croatian league champion: 2006

Iceland
Icelandic league champion: 1999
Icelandic Basketball Cup: 1999

Israel
Israeli league champion (4): 2003
Israeli Basketball Cup (4):

Israel
Polish league champion: 2004

Accomplishments

Israel
Ligat ha'Al assists leader : 2003, 2005

References

External links
Limor Mizrachi at fibaeurope.com
Limor Mizrachi at eurobasket.com
Polish league statistics at basketligakobiet.pl
ABL statistics
Profile at safsal.co.il

1970 births
Living people
Israeli expatriate basketball people in Iceland
Israeli expatriate basketball people in the United States
Israeli women's basketball players
People from Givatayim
Point guards
Úrvalsdeild kvenna basketball players
KR women's basketball players
New England Blizzard players